Yarnema is a rural locality (a village) in Yarnemskoye Rural Settlement of Plesetsky District, Arkhangelsk Oblast, Russia. The population was 160 as of 2010. There are 5 streets.

Geography 
Yarnema is located on the Onega River, 83 km northwest of Plesetsk (the district's administrative centre) by road. Ig is the nearest rural locality.

References 

Rural localities in Plesetsky District